Dalian University is a university in Dalian, Liaoning, China under the provincial government. Its predecessor was the Dalian Branch of Dalian Institute of Technology. In 1983, it independently ran a school and changed its name to Dalian University.

References